Lynyrd Skynyrd Lyve: The Vicious Cycle Tour is the fifth live album and third video by American southern rock band Lynyrd Skynyrd.

It was recorded on July 11, 2003 at the Amsouth Amphitheater in Antioch, Nashville, Tennessee as part of their 30th anniversary tour supporting their twelfth studio album Vicious Cycle.

It was released on November 18, 2003 on DVD and was released on CD on June 22, 2004. The video releases were certified Gold by RIAA in 2004.

Track listing

CD

DVD

Personnel
Johnny Van Zant - Lead vocals
Gary Rossington - Guitar
Billy Powell - Keyboards, piano
Rickey Medlocke - Guitar, mandolin, vocals
Hughie Thomasson - Guitar, vocals
Ean Evans - Bass, vocals
Michael Cartellone - Drums
Dale Krantz-Rossington - Background vocals
Carol Chase - Background vocals

Additional personnel

Jim Horn – saxophone (leader)
Samuel B. Levine – saxophone
Steve G. Patrick – trumpet
Connie Ellisor – violinist (leader/arranger)
James Grosjean – violinist
Anthony La Marchina – cello
Pamela Sixfin – violin
Alan R. Umstead – violin
Mary Kathryn Van Osdale – violin
Steve "Boxcar" Traum – harmonica

Certifications

References

Lynyrd Skynyrd live albums
2004 live albums
Sanctuary Records live albums
Lynyrd Skynyrd video albums